A spark plug is an electrical device in some internal combustion engines and ignites fuel by means of an electric spark.

Spark plug may also refer to:

Spark plug, a rod of uranium or plutonium in a hydrogen bomb used to heat the fusion fuel to the point of nuclear fusion
Bob "Spark Plug" Holly, an American professional wrestler
Spark Plug, Barney Google's race horse from the Barney Google and Snuffy Smith comic strip
Spark Plug (album), a 1971 album by jazz soul guitarist Melvin Sparks
"Spark Plug", a song by Stereolab from their 1996 album Emperor Tomato Ketchup
"Spark Plug", a song by Idiot Pilot from their 2005 album Strange We Should Meet Here
Spark Plug Mountain, in Washington, United States

Sparkplug may also refer to:
Sparkplug Witwicky, a Transformers G1 human character
Sparkplug lighthouse, a type of lighthouse named for its shape
Sparkplug Comics, a comics publisher